Kiese is a surname. Notable people with the surname include:

Carlos Kiese (born 1957), Paraguayan footballer and manager
Hermann Kiese (1865–1923), German rosarian
Hugo Enrique Kiese  (born 1954), Paraguay footballer
Isaac Kiese Thelin (born 1992), Swedish footballer 
Rivaldo González Kiese (born 1987), Paraguayan football player

Kiese is a given name. Notable people with the given name include:
Kiese Laymon (born 1974), American writer, editor and professor of English and Creative Writing

References